Segametsi Mogomotsi was a 14-year-old schoolgirl who was found murdered on 6 November 1994 in Mochudi, Botswana. She went missing sometime on 5 November, and her body was found naked and mutilated in an open space the next morning. The dipheko (medicine murder) sparked protests by the students at the Radikolo Community Junior Secondary School (RCJSS), the school where she attended, as well as among the citizens of Mochudi. The protests led to riots in neighbouring Gaborone, prompting the government of Botswana to call in the Scotland Yard. No one has been formally charged with the murder, and an official police report was conducted, but as of August 2012, the results have not yet been released. The murder inspired the stories in Unity Dow's novel The Screaming of the Innocent, Michael Stanley's mystery Deadly Harvest, and Alexander McCall Smith novel The No. 1 Ladies' Detective Agency.

Background

The ritual murder of a person whose body parts are cut off to make muti (medicine) that is used in ceremonies to promote business deals or success is common in Botswana. The British dealt with ritual murder cases when the country was still a protectorate as early as the 1930s, and social scientist Cyprian Fisiy has called witchcraft "the primary concern of most African communities". Children, especially highly educated students, are the primary targets of dipheko (rituals) because of their perceived potential for success. When social anthropologist Ørnulf Gulbrandsen interviewed several Batswana, one man said that, "we have no other way to explain how some people become rich overnight". Most accused people in cases of ritual murders recount either being possessed to murder or being threatened by future attacks through boloi (witchcraft) and thus were coerced to kill.

Murder
In November 1996, anthropologist Charlanne Burke interviewed a student who summarised the murder:

Investigation
Segametsi's stepfather was arrested after confessing that he and other local businessmen killed the girl, but he retracted his statement, saying that the confession was really a second-hand account. While the named businessmen were arrested, they were released, sparking controversy in Mochudi. In 2008, Sekobye Mokgalo, one of the named businessmen, asked for government compensation for the wrongful conviction. In 2009, he received 10000,000 Botswana pula for damages from the government.

Protests
In January 1995, students at Radikolo Community Junior Secondary School organized a march at the District Commissioner's office in Mochudi in response "perceived [...] government collusion in the practice of witchcraft". The march escalated into riots and protesters burned the house of the suspects. The violence continued in Gaborone starting on 16 February 1995. An ad hoc group, the Revolutionary War Council, pressed for justice "without [the] state's intervention." The Special Services Group, the riot police of the Botswana Defence Force, used tear gas on protesters in the central business district while students at the University of Botswana stormed an ongoing meeting of the National Assembly of Botswana. President Quett Masire issued a statement in response to the protests:

Both rioters and police were injured: more than fifteen protesters were treated for rubber bullet wounds at the Deborah Relief Memorial Hospital, a small boy was killed and a bystander was paralyzed; both by police rubber bullets. A man was later executed by the police for the protests. The Botswana National Front Youth League criticized the government's response to the riots, saying that the military force was "not in keeping with democratic practice and may signal the emergence of a police/military state".

See also
List of unsolved murders

References

Sources

1970s births
1990s missing person cases
1990s murders in Botswana
1994 crimes in Botswana
1994 deaths
1994 murders in Africa
Botswana murder victims
Crimes involving Satanism or the occult
Deaths by person in Africa
Female murder victims
Formerly missing people
Incidents of violence against girls
Kgatleng District
Murdered Botswana children
November 1994 crimes
November 1994 events in Africa
People murdered in Botswana
Traditional African medicine
Unsolved murders in Botswana
Violence against women in Botswana